is a Japanese cyclist. She competed in the women's cross-country mountain biking event at the 1996 Summer Olympics.

References

External links
 

1970 births
Living people
Japanese female cyclists
Olympic cyclists of Japan
Cyclists at the 1996 Summer Olympics
Sportspeople from Tokyo
20th-century Japanese women
21st-century Japanese women